Ted Walsh (born 14 April 1950) is an Irish amateur jockey turned racehorse trainer who was born and raised in Co. Cork but based in Kill, County Kildare, Ireland. Ted is also father to amateur Irish National Hunt jockey, Katie Walsh and professional national hunt jockey Ruby Walsh.

Jockey
As a rider, he won 4 Cheltenham Festival races. His first was in the 1974 Kim Muir on Castleruddery. His last was in the 1986 Foxhunter Chase on Attitude adjuster. He also won the 1979 Queen Mother Champion Chase on Hilly Way. Another horse he had success on was Daring Run who won the 1981 and 1982 Aintree Hurdle, was a close third in the 1981 Champion Hurdle. He won the Irish amateur jockeys title 11 times.

Trainer
One of his more famous training achievements was training Papillon to win the 2000 English Grand National and Commanche Court to win the Irish Grand National, both ridden by his son Ruby Walsh. The latter horse had won the Triumph Hurdle for him, and jockey Norman Williamson in 1997. That was Ted's first winner at the Cheltenham Festival as a trainer. In the 2002 Cheltenham Gold Cup Commanche Court, ridden by Ruby, also finished second behind Best Mate. Walsh also trained Rince Ri who won two Ericsson chases as well as a Pillar Chase (he came second in another) and a Power Gold Cup. Ted trained Jack High to finish second behind Numbersixvalverde (ridden by Ruby) in the 2005 Irish Grand National. However, he gained compensation when Jack High won the Betfred Gold Cup (formerly the Whitbread) at Sandown later that year. In the 2012 English Grand National he trained third placed Seabass which was ridden by his daughter Katie Walsh.

Media

Ted has been a regular pundit on RTE Racing which covers some of important and popular race meetings on RTE television since the 1980s. This includes the Dublin Racing Festival in Leopardstown in February. The Irish Gand National festival in Fairyhouse at Easter. Punchestown National Hunt Festival in late April. Various flat Racing classics such as The Irish Derby in the Curragh at the end of June. The Galway summer festival and flat Racing festival in September. And the Christmas Racing festival from Leopardstown.

Cheltenham Festival winners as jockey (4) 
 Queen Mother Champion Chase - (1) Hilly Way (1979)
 Fulke Walwyn Kim Muir Challenge Cup - (2) Castleruddery (1974), Prolan (1976)
 St James's Place Foxhunter Chase - (1) Attitude Adjuster (1986)

Cheltenham Festival winners as trainer (2) 
 Triumph Hurdle - (1) Commanche Court (1997)
 Fulke Walwyn Kim Muir Challenge Cup - (1) Any Second Now (2019)

Major wins as jockey
 Ireland
 Irish Champion Hurdle - (2) Daring Run (1981,1982)

Major wins as trainer
 Ireland
 Punchestown Gold Cup - (1) Commanche Court (2000)
 Ryanair Gold Cup - (1) Rince Ri (1999)
 Savills Chase - (2) 	Rince Ri (1999,2000)
 Fort Leney Novice Chase - (1) Southern Vic (2005)
 Paddy's Reward Club Chase - (1) Papillon (1998)
 Christmas Hurdle (Ireland) - (1) Commanche Court (1998)

References

Irish racehorse owners and breeders
Sportspeople from County Cork
Irish racehorse trainers
Irish jockeys
Living people
1950 births
People from Fermoy